Odilla is a genus of moths of the family Crambidae. It contains only one species, Odilla noralis, which is found in Puerto Rico and Cuba.

References

Musotiminae
Crambidae genera
Taxa named by William Schaus